Shakedown is a 1950 American crime film noir directed by Joseph Pevney and starring Howard Duff, Brian Donlevy, Peggy Dow, Lawrence Tierney, Bruce Bennett and Anne Vernon.

Plot
Unscrupulous newspaper photographer Jack Early is sent to take a picture of racketeer Nick Palmer, who doesn't like to be photographed. Palmer takes a liking to Early and asks him to frame his henchman Colton, but Early double-crosses Palmer and informs Colton that his boss had planned to frame him. Shortly afterward, Palmer is killed by a car bomb and Early becomes famous for snapping a photo of the event. Eventually Early is killed by Colton but he manages to take a picture of his murderer in the act.

Cast
 Howard Duff as Jack Early 
 Brian Donlevy as Nick Palmer 
 Peggy Dow as Ellen Bennett 
 Lawrence Tierney as Colton 
 Bruce Bennett as David Glover 
 Anne Vernon as Nita Palmer (as Ann Vernon)
 Stapleton Kent as City Editor 
 Peter Virgo as Roy
 Charles Sherlock as Sam
Rock Hudson as Nightclub Doorman (uncredited)

See also
 List of American films of 1950

References

External links
 
 
 
 
 

1950 films
1950 crime drama films
American black-and-white films
American crime drama films
Film noir
Films about photojournalists
Films directed by Joseph Pevney
Films set in San Francisco
Universal Pictures films
1950 directorial debut films
1950s English-language films
1950s American films